GSSHA (Gridded Surface/Subsurface Hydrologic Analysis) is a two-dimensional, physically based watershed model developed by the Engineer Research and Development Center of the United States Army Corps of Engineers.  It simulates surface water and groundwater hydrology, erosion and sediment transport. The GSSHA model is used for hydraulic engineering and research, and is on the Federal Emergency Management Agency (FEMA) list of hydrologic models accepted for use in the national flood insurance program for flood hydrograph estimation. Input is best prepared by the Watershed Modeling System interface, which effectively links the model with geographic information systems (GIS).

GSSHA uses a square-grid, constant grid-size representation of watershed topography and characteristics, similar to a digital elevation model representation.  Relevant model parameters are assigned to the model grids using index maps.   Index maps are often derived from soils, landuse/land cover, vegetation, or other physiographic maps.

History

The GSSHA model was derived from the CASC2D hydrologic model.   GSSHA represents a significant improvement on CASC2D in terms of capabilities, options, and numerical procedures.  GSSHA includes dynamic time-stepping depending on stability criteria, different time steps for different numerical processes, and the ability to run on multi-processor computers.  Processes included in GSSHA include surface and ground water flow, channel hydraulics, evapotranspiration, erosion and sedimentation, storm drainage networks, tile drains, a variety of hydraulic structures, and contaminant/nutrient fate and transport.

Formulation

GSSHA uses a regular square grid computational discretization of the watershed. Elevation data are taken from a digital elevation model.

GSSHA uses a vector channel representation.  This allows feature allows channels to flow in any direction and meander, independent from the grid resolution; this feature accurately preserves channel length and slope.

The  GSSHA model was developed from the outset to be capable of 'long term' simulations consisting of multiple events.  As such, required inputs include meteorological variables, and surface energy-balance parameters.  Seasonality in evapotranspiration parameters is included in the model.

Overland and channel flow hydraulics are based on explicit, finite-volume, diffusive wave schemes.  The overland and channel flow routines use dynamic time stepping to improve model stability and decrease simulation times.

Surface and subsurface stores are linked though the vadose zone using a number of different optional numerical methods.  A two-dimensional finite-difference groundwater solver is coupled to streams through a stream bed conductance layer.

There are a number of optional methods to calculate erosion and sediment transport.  The model can be used to simulate transport of sediments with specific gravity different from sand.

Specific process simulation options

 Rainfall input
 rain gages, inverse-distance squared or nearest neighbor interpolation
 radar-rainfall
 Evapotranspiration using the Penman–Monteith equation
 Infiltration
 Green-Ampt
 Multi-layer Green-Ampt
 Green-Ampt with redistribution
 Richards equation
 Overland flow
 Explicit finite-volume diffusive wave
 Explicit finite-volume alternating-direction predictor-corrector diffusive wave
 Overland flow dikes, such as roadway embankments
 Channel flow using explicit finite-volume diffusive-wave
 Hydraulic structures
 Weirs
 Culverts
 Detention basins
 Lakes
 Wetlands
 Rating curves
 Rule curves
 Scheduled releases
 Overland erosion and sediment transport
 Detachment limits
 Raindrop impact
 Deposition
 Arbitrary sediment size classes
 Arbitrary sediment specific gravity
 Sediment transport using three different optional equations
 Kilinc and Richardson
 Englund Hanson 
 Stream power
 Channel sediment transport
 Sand routing using stream power
 Fines routing using advection-diffusion
 Two-dimensional groundwater
 Two-dimensional finite-difference scheme
 Wells
 Constant head and constant flux boundary conditions
 Stream/aquifer interaction

Current additions to the GSSHA model include source/sink/transport of nutrients and contaminants.

Computational specifics

GSSHA is programmed in C++, and runs on Windows or Linux computers.  The model is command line driven and can be used in a batch mode.  Parallel computing is enabled at present using the MPI or the OpenMP approach.  Work is underway to port the code to run on massively parallel distributed memory architecture machines.

Applications to date

 Flash flood modeling
 Soil moisture predictions
 Sediment loading to receiving water bodies
 Tidal and hurricane storm surge coastal flood forecasting
 Engineering design
 Hydrology education
 Hydrologic research

References

External links
GSSHA WIKI
Department of Defense Watershed Modeling System
WMS
FEMA List of Hydrologic Models Meeting the Minimum Requirement of National Flood Insurance Program

Integrated hydrologic modelling
Hydrology models
Public-domain software
Hydrology software